Al-Hallaq is a surname of Arabic origin.

List of people with he surname 

 Boutros Al-Hallaq, Syrian politician
 Eyad al-Hallaq, Palestinian shooting victim

See also 

 Tahit Moos Al-Hallaq, Iraqi TV show
 Al Halaqah

Surnames
Arabic-language surnames
Surnames of Arabic origin